Raein is an Italian hardcore punk band that features members of La Quiete and the post-rock band Neil on Impression. The band broke up in late 2005, but after a hiatus of almost 2 years (in which they played 2 shows) they got back to play together in September 2007. They are often held responsible for bringing the screamo genre to Europe following its high point in the United States during the careers of bands such as Orchid and Saetia.

Biography
In 2008, Raein released a new album, embarking on an extensive international tour in 2009 to support the new release.

In 2011 they released their album Sulla linea dell'orizzonte fra questa mia vita e quella di tutti for free on their website.

At the beginning of 2013, the band once again embarked on an extensive tour of the US, UK, Canada and Puerto Rico, playing 20 shows in 22 days. In April a 7" split with Loma Prieta was released on Deathwish Inc. records.

Raein 4th studio album Perpeetum was released on April 30, 2015, through their Facebook page, followed by an 8" split with Ampere. That year they appeared at Fluff Fest in the Czech Republic for the third time after 2008 and 2011.

Band members 
Current
 Alessio Valmori: guitar, vocals (2002–present)
 Andrea Console: vocals (2002–present)
 Giuseppe Coluccelli: guitar, vocals (2002–present)
 Nicola Amadori: bass (2009–present)
 Michele Camorani: drums (2002–present)

Former
 Marco Montesano: bass (2002–2009)
 Taylor
 Riccardo Bresciani: guitar

Timeline

Discography
Studio Album

Compilation Album

EP

Split

Compilations

References

External links
 Official Website
 MySpace

Italian musical groups
Screamo musical groups
Musical groups established in 2002
2002 establishments in Italy